The Military ranks of Austria (or Ranks of the ) are the military insignia used by the Austrian Armed Forces. Austria is a landlocked country and has no navy.

Military ranks

Commissioned officer ranks
The rank insignia of commissioned officers.

Other ranks
The rank insignia of non-commissioned officers and enlisted personnel.

Special case military gymnasium 
Pupils of the Military gymnasium wear black shoulder rank insignias on their dress uniform. On the duty suits black mounting loops have to be worn. However, the particular insignia has to be in line with actual school level. The appropriate school year is symbolised by a small golden strip.

Possible appointments in correlation to rank or grade

Additions 
To the rank or grade might be (among others) added addendums as follows.

e.g.: MjrA (major physician), Lt aD (lieutenant off duty), ObstdG (colonel of the general staff service), HptmdhmtD (captain of the higher military technical service), ObstltdIntD (lieutenant colonel of the commissariat service), Olt dRes (first lieutenant of the reserve), Bgdr iR (general brigadier retired).

See also
Waffenfarbe (Austria)
Rank insignia of the Austro-Hungarian armed forces

Notes

References

External links 
 
 
 
 

Military ranks of Austria